Brain Boost, also known as The Professor's Brain Trainer in Australia and Europe, is a series of three brain-training games developed by Interchannel for the Nintendo DS handheld game console. Brain Boost was originally released in 2005 in Japan. Majesco Entertainment published the first two games in the series in the United States on November 17, 2006, and the third game on January 22, 2008. Each game consists of five related mini-games.

Games 
Brain Boost Beta Wave, subtitled "Improve your concentration",  The Professor's Brain Trainer: Logic in Australia and Europe.
Brain Boost Gamma Wave, subtitled "Improve your memory", a.k.a. The Professor's Brain Trainer: Memory in Australia and Europe.
Mega Brain Boost, subtitled "Boost your brain power with 3 games-in-1".  This game includes Brain Boost Beta Wave, Brain Boost Gamma Wave, and a new game.

Critical reception 
Brain Boost Beta Wave has a Metacritic score of 39% based on 12 critic reviews.

See also
Big Brain Academy
Brain Age and Brain Age 2
Brain Challenge

References 

2005 video games
505 Games games
Brain training video games
Nintendo DS games
Nintendo DS-only games
Video games developed in Japan
Majesco Entertainment games